Puyango is a canton of the Province of Loja, Ecuador. It is located in the west of the province, and borders the cantons of Paltas, Celica, Pindal, and Zapotillo.

Sources
World-Gazetteer.com

Cantons of Loja Province